Fireproof is Christian band Pillar's second full-length album and their most successful, having sold over 300,000 copies. It was released in at least three different versions including a Remixed version and a limited Special Edition that came with Pillar's All Day Every Day DVD and a slipcase.  The track listings from the original and the reissue are very similar, rearranging the track listing a little and retitling the tracks "Just 2 Get By" to "Just to Get By" and "Further" to "Further From Myself". The title track, "Fireproof", was featured in the baseball video game MLB 2005 and on its soundtrack CD release. This is the first record to feature current guitarist Noah Henson.

Critical reception

Fireproof garnered generally positive reception from five music critics. At CCM Magazine, Kevin Breuner graded the album an A−, saying that due to the high quality of the release the band should have a long future, and they are staking out their own "musical territory" on an album that comes with "Layers of interesting guitar work and well-crafted songs help take Fireproof beyond the typical power chords and guitar riffs that can become cliché to the genre." Founder Tony Cummings of Cross Rhythms rated the album a nine out of a ten, stating that "Many of the lyrics here derive from Daniel 3 and with Pillar's call to radical commitment to Christ the melodic hooks, rapid syllable rapping and high octane drumming make this one of the best examples of commercial hard music you are likely to hear this year." At Christianity Today, Russ Breimeier rated the album three-and-a-half stars, calling it "a well-made project from everyone involved in its production". Founder John DiBiase of Jesus Freak Hideout rated the album three-and-a-half stars, writing that the release is "Maybe not innovative or anything all too original or new, [but] Fireproof is still a leap in the right direction for this young group." At AllMusic, Alex Henderson rated the album three stars, affirming that the release "isn't innovative", however noting that "there is a lot to like about this solid, if derivative, CD".

Track listing for the 2003 remixed/remastered version

 "Fireproof" – 3:46
 "Behind Closed Doors" – 2:57
 "A Shame" – 3:19
 "Echelon" – 3:51
 "Hindsight" – 2:59
 "Light at My Feet" – 3:29
 "Stay Up" (featuring KJ-52) – 3:32
 "Epidemic" – 3:17
 "Just to Get By" – 3:30
 "Indivisible" – 3:24
 "Further from Myself" – 4:28
 "Fireproof [Radio Mix]" - 3:47

Track listing for original 2002 release
 "Fireproof" – 3:46
 "Just to Get By" – 4:17
 "Echelon" – 3:25
 "Stay Up" (featuring KJ-52) – 3:40
 "Behind Closed Doors" – 2:55
 "Epidemic" – 3:14
 "Hindsight" – 2:57
 "Light at My Feet" – 3:28
 "A Shame" – 3:17
 "Indivisible" – 3:20
 "Further" – 4:24

References

Pillar (band) albums
Flicker Records albums
2003 albums